Sedment is the name of a village in Egypt. In Egyptology it is mainly known for a series of cemeteries excavated near this village. The cemeteries were the target of several expeditions, the most substantial one under Flinders Petrie and Guy Brunton. Their work was published in two volumes. They found several hundred burials dating from around 3000 BC to the New Kingdom. Especially many burials were found dating to the First Intermediate Period and New Kingdom. The First Intermediate Period burials contained several inscribed coffins, but also many burials with wooden models. The New Kingdom burials were found much looted, but some reliefs found demonstrate that several tombs were adorned with a relief–decorated chapel above ground. The largest tomb was that of the vizier Prehotep, who was in office under king Ramses II.

References 

Archaeological sites in Egypt